Gangzicun station, is a station on Line 4 of the Nanjing Metro and is a planned interchange station with the future Line 6. The station is located underneath the intersection of Bancang Street, Longpan Road, and North Anmen Street and is situated between Xuanwu Lake, Purple Mountain, White Horse Park, and the Nanjing Sun Palace. Because of its location, it has been called by local media as "one of the busiest tourist stations".

Construction began in June 2012 and the station opened for passenger service on January 18, 2017 alongside seventeen other stations as part of the first phase of Line 4. On its inaugural day, Gangzicun Station was one of the highest-ridership stations on the newly opened Line 4, along with Longjiang Station and Gulou Station.

References

Railway stations in Jiangsu
Railway stations in China opened in 2017
Nanjing Metro stations